Saints Cyril and Methodius Slovak Roman Catholic School, now known as Schoolhouse Apartments, is a historic Catholic school building located at Binghamton in Broome County, New York. It was built in 1910 and is a two-story over a raised basement, steel frame building clad in brick. The building is rectangular in shape, 85 feet wide by 45 feet deep.

It was listed on the National Register of Historic Places in 2007.

References

Buildings and structures in Binghamton, New York
National Register of Historic Places in Broome County, New York
School buildings on the National Register of Historic Places in New York (state)
Catholic elementary schools in New York (state)
Roman Catholic churches completed in 1910
Slovak-American culture in New York (state)
20th-century Roman Catholic church buildings in the United States